Bollo is a bun, popular in Latin America, made from corn, yuca or potato. Variations are eaten in Colombian cuisine, Cuban cuisine ( Tamal de maíz solamente ) and Panamanian cuisine. Corn and yuca bollos are an indigenous food of the Caribbean coast of Colombia and Panama, where they are boiled in leaves. This preparation is similar to the humita of the Andes, the hallaquita of Venezuela and the pamonha of Brazil. 

In Colombia, bollos are sold by street vendors along the Colombian coast, as well as in stores and supermarkets. They are primarily served for breakfast as an accompaniment with cheese.

Panamanian bollo has been described as a type of tamale.

See also
 List of maize dishes

References

Breads
Spanish cuisine
Colombian cuisine
Cuban cuisine
Panamanian cuisine
Maize dishes